A screenplay writer (also called screenwriter, scriptwriter, scribe or scenarist) is a writer who practices the craft of screenwriting, writing screenplays on which mass media, such as films, television programs and video games, are based.

Terminology

In the silent era, writers now considered screenwriters were denoted by terms such as photoplaywright, photoplay writer, photoplay dramatist and screen playwright.  Screenwriting historian Steven Maras notes that these early writers were often understood as being the authors of the films as shown and argues that they cannot be precisely equated with present-day screenwriters because they were responsible for a technical product, a brief "scenario", "treatment", or "synopsis" that is a written synopsis of what is to be filmed.

Profession
Screenwriting is a freelance profession. No education is required to be a professional screenwriter, just good storytelling abilities and imagination. Screenwriters are not hired employees but contracted freelancers. Most, if not all, screenwriters start their careers writing on speculation (spec) and so write without being hired or paid for it. If such a script is sold, it is called a spec script. What separates a professional screenwriter from an amateur screenwriter is that professional screenwriters are usually represented by a talent agency. Also, professional screenwriters do not often work for free, but amateur screenwriters will often work for free and are considered "writers in training." Spec scripts are usually penned by unknown professional screenwriters and amateur screenwriters.

There are a legion of would-be screenwriters who attempt to enter the film industry, but it often takes years of trial and error, failure, and gritty persistence to achieve success. In Writing Screenplays that Sell, Michael Hague writes, "Screenplays have become, for the last half of [the twentieth] century, what the Great American Novel was for the first half. Closet writers who used to dream of the glory of getting into print now dream of seeing their story on the big or small screen."

Film industry
Every screenplay and teleplay begins with a thought or idea, and screenwriters use their ideas to write scripts, with the intention of selling them and having them produced. In some cases, the script is based on an existing property, such as a book or person's life story, which is adapted by the screenwriter. The majority of the time, a film project gets initiated by a screenwriter. The initiator of the project gets the exclusive writing assignment. They are referred to as "exclusive" assignments or "pitched" assignments. Screenwriters who often pitch new projects, whether original or an adaptation, often do not have to worry about competing for assignments and are often more successful. When word is put out about a project a film studio, production company, or producer wants done, they are referred to as "open" assignments. Open assignments are more competitive. If screenwriters are competing for an open assignment, more established writers usually win the assignments. A screenwriter can also be approached and personally offered a writing assignment.

Script doctoring
Many screenwriters also work as full or part-time script doctors, attempting to better a script to suit the desires of a director or studio. For instance, studio management may have a complaint that the motivations of the characters are unclear or that the dialogue is weak.

Hollywood has shifted writers onto and off projects since its earliest days, and the assignment of credits is not always straightforward or complete, which poses a problem for film study. In his book Talking Pictures, Richard Corliss discussed the historian's dilemma: "A writer may be given screen credit for work he didn't do (as with Sidney Buchman on Holiday), or be denied credit for work he did do (as with Sidney Buchman on The Awful Truth)."

Development process
After a screenwriter finishes a project, they pair with an industry-based representative, such as a producer, director, literary agent, entertainment lawyer, or entertainment executive. The partnerships often pitch their project to investors or others in a position to further a project. Once the script is sold, the writer has only the rights that were agreed with the purchaser.

A screenwriter becomes credible by having work that is recognized, which gives the writer the opportunity to earn a higher income. As more films are produced independently (outside the studio system), many up-and-coming screenwriters are turning to pitch fests, screenplay contests, and independent development services to gain access to established and credible independent producers. Many development executives are now working independently to incubate their own pet projects.

Production involvement
Screenwriters are rarely involved in the production of a film. Sometimes they come on as advisors, or if they are established, as a producer. Some screenwriters also direct. Although many scripts are sold each year, many do not make it into production because the number of scripts that are purchased every year exceeds the number of professional directors that are working in the film and TV industry. When a screenwriter finishes a project and sells it to a film studio, production company, TV network, or producer, they often have to continue networking, mainly with directors or executives, and push to have their projects "chosen" and turned into films or TV shows. If interest in a script begins to fade, a project can go dead.

Union
Most professional screenwriters in the U.S. are unionized and are represented by the Writers Guild of America. Although membership in the WGA is recommended, it is not required of a screenwriter to join. The WGA is the final arbiter on awarding writing credit for projects under its jurisdiction.  The WGA also looks upon and verifies film copyright materials.

Salary
Minimum salaries for union screenwriters are set by the Writers Guild of America.  Non-union screenwriters may write for free; an established screenwriter may write for millions of dollars.

Definitions

Against: A word used to describe a script's unproduced price relative to its value if approved for production—for example, if a script is sold for $300,000, but the writer gains an extra $200,000 if it leads to production, the screenwriter's salary is described as "$300,000 against $500,000".
 Option: If a script is not purchased, it may be optioned.  An option is money paid in exchange for the right (the "option") to produce—and therefore to purchase outright—a screenplay, treatment, or other work within a certain period.
 Feature assignment: The writer writes the script on assignment under contract with a studio, production company, or individual.
 Pitch: The writer holds a five- to twenty-minute presentation of the film to buyers in a short meeting.
 Rewriting: The writer rewrites someone else's script for pay. The writer pitches their "take", much like they would an original pitch.
 Spec script: Short for "speculative" or "on speculation" as in; "She wrote her script on spec". The writer writes the script (original or someone else's idea) without being paid, and, subsequently, tries to sell it.

History
 1900: One of America's first screenwriters, New York journalist Roy McCardell, is hired to write ten scenarios (each about 90 seconds long) for $15 each.
 1949: Ben Hecht is paid $10,000 a week (about $ in ). Claims David O. Selznick paid him $3,500 a day (about $ in ).
 1984: Shane Black sells the screenplay to Lethal Weapon for $250,000.
 1990: Kathy McWorter, who was promoted by her agent as a 21-year-old wunderkind, though in fact she was 28 years old, sells her sex comedy The Cheese Stands Alone for $1 million. This was followed by nuclear-terrorist technothriller The Ultimatum by Laurence Dworet and Robert Roy Pool, and WWII action comedy Hell Bent... and Back! by Doug Richardson and Rick Jaffa, both of which sold for a million dollars. None of these movies has been produced so far.
 1992: Sherry Lansing is hired to run Paramount and spends $3.6 million in less than a week, $2.5 million for a two-page outline of Jade by Joe Eszterhas, and $1.1 million (about $ in 2018) for the script Milk Money by John Mattson. Both deals are records, respectively, for outlines and romantic comedy specs.
 2005: Terry Rossio and Bill Marsilii are paid $3 million against $5 million for the script of Déjà Vu.

Current records
Some of the highest amounts paid to writers for spec screenplays:

$5 million:

 Déjà Vu by Terry Rossio and Bill Marsilii

$2 million:
 Arthur & Lancelot (unproduced) by David Dobkin

$1 million:

Milk Money by John Mattson ($1.1 million, outright purchase)
Epsilon (unproduced) by Rhett Reese and Paul Wernick ("Sources say the Sony deal closed in the $1 million range.")
 The Imitation Game by Graham Moore, at "seven figures" to Warner Brothers

See also
 Film crew
 First-look deal
 Lists of screenwriters
 List of screenwriting software
 Playwright
 Screenwriter's salary
 Script (comics)
 Showrunner
 Television crew
 Television director
 Television program creator

References

External links

Spec Script Sales Analysis 2008: Top Sales

Writing occupations
Mass media occupations